James E. McNellie's Public House is an Irish-themed pub and restaurant located in midtown Oklahoma City, Oklahoma and downtown Tulsa, Oklahoma. McNellies is known for its extensive beer selection that includes over 350 varieties from around the world and which earned them a place in Draft Magazine's list of America's 100 Best Beer Bars for 2011 and Paste Magazine's 30 Best Beer Bars in America in 2010. Aside from its beer selection, McNellie's is also well known for its annual St. Patrick's Day celebration which draws around 7,000 patrons and its Pub Run held every November. McNellie's was opened in 2004 by Elliot Nelson, a Tulsa entrepreneur who owns several other restaurants and bars in Oklahoma including El Guapo's Cantina, Fassler Hall, The Bull and Bear, Dilly Deli, Yokozuna, The Colony, Brady Tavern, Dust Bowl Lounge and Lanes, McNellie's Oklahoma City, and Abner's Ale House.

References 

Restaurants in Oklahoma
Buildings and structures in Tulsa, Oklahoma
Companies based in Tulsa, Oklahoma